Grethe Inga Rottböll Sund, née Grethe Inga Poulsen, (born 11 February 1956) is a Swedish singer and author. She lives and works in Sweden and writes books for adults and children under´the name Grethe Rottböll. During the 1990s she worked as a singer (mezzo-soprano) in operas and operettas. Since May 2018 she is the chairman of Sveriges Författarförbund.

Biography
Grethe Rottböll grew up in a family who were all singers. She lost both her parents at a young age and decided to take her father's family name Rottböll as her last name. In 1979 she moved to Stockholm, and in 1981 she published her first book called Att vara Emilia. In 1988, Rottböll published the book Rosenodlaren.

During many years in the 1990s, Rottböl worked as a mezzosoprano singer. She sang a.o. "Cherubino" in The Marriage of Figaro, Prince Orlovsky in Die Fledermaus. Orpheus in Orpheus and Eurydice.

Rottböll along with her husband Håkan Sund started the Bergslagenoperan in Bergslagen.

In the early 2000s, she started publishing children's books. She has also written factual books about animals and nature. She has also published two books about the boy character Ole, with illustrations by Anna-Karin Garhamn. She has also published factual books on subjects like singing, rhetoric, theatre, traffic, circus and dragons. With illustration work by Lisen Ådbåge, Rottböll has published the much liked books about Tio vilda hästar (ten wild horses). In 2013, she published the book Jon har ett svart hål i sitt röda hjärta (Jon has a black hole in his red heart); the book tells about death in a way which is understandable for children .

Bibliography
Writings:

Novels 
 Att vara Emilia, 1981, Norstedts]
 Rosenodlaren, 1988, Norstedts

Books 
 Sant och sagolikt om sång, children's book, 1999, Alfabeta
 Hallå! tala berätta rappa, children's book, 1999, Rabén & Sjögren
 Scenrävar och teaterapor, 2002, Rabén & Sjögren
 Hitteboken, 2005, Rabén & Sjögren
 Henrys cirkus, 2005, Rabén & Sjögren
 Pang! sa det, 2007, Rabén & Sjögren
 Barnvagnsgaloppen, 2008, Rabén & Sjögren
 Ole
 Ole hos doktor Semla och Syster Bella, 2008, Rabén & Sjögren
 Ole får en hamster, 2009, Rabén & Sjögren
 Ole är hungrig på godis, 2010, Egmont Kärnan
 Vad händer med jorden, 2008, Rabén & Sjögren
 Häng med i trafiken, 2009, Rabén & Sjögren
 Häng med på cykel, 2010, Rabén & Sjögren
 Alla vill ha mat!, 2011, Bonnier Carlsen
 Tio vilda hästar, 2011, Rabén & Sjögren
 Alla vill ha ett bo, 2012, Bonnier Carlsen
 Kryp som är små Var då?, 2013, Bonnier Carlsen
 Hästfesten, 2013, Rabén & Sjögren
 Jon har ett svart hål i sitt röda hjärta, 2013, Bonnier Carlsen
 Allt det här kan jag, 2014, Lilla Piratförlaget	
 Tio vilda hästar till toppen, 2015, Rabén & Sjögren
 Vulkanen och kalven som Po räddade, 2016, Vombat
 Vinge äger hela havet, 2017, Rabén & Sjögren 
 Första Naturhjälpen räddar djuren, 2017, Bonnier Carlsen
 Tio vilda hästar firar jul, 2017, Rabén & Sjögren

Anthology 
 Bom bom, 2005, Rabén & Sjögren
 Smarta små upptäcker naturen, 2011, Rabén & Sjögren
 Smarta små upptäcker skolan, 2012, Rabén & Sjögren
 ABC 123, 2012, Bonnier Carlsen
 Min lilla skattkammare, 2012, Natur & Kultur

References 

Living people
1956 births
Swedish women singers
Swedish women writers
Swedish opera singers
People from Gothenburg